The Hanteng X8  is a mid-size crossover utility vehicle (CUV) produced by the Chinese manufacturer Hanteng Autos since 2019.

Overview

The Hanteng X8 is Hanteng's largest crossover SUV product as of 2020. It was first unveiled during the 2019 Shanghai Auto Show. Being heavily based on the same platform as the slightly smaller Hanteng X7, the Hanteng X8 is powered by the same 2.0-litre turbocharged engine as the one powering the Hanteng X7, producing a maximum output of 190 hp and a peak torque of 250N.m. The engine of the Hanteng X8 is mated to the 6-speed dual-clutch transmission.

References

External links

Hanteng Official website

Hanteng X8
mid-size sport utility vehicles
Front-wheel-drive vehicles
2010s cars
Cars introduced in 2019
Cars of China